Radoszyce (‎, ‎ Radoshits, "Radoshitz, Radoschitz, Radoszyc") is a town in Końskie County, Świętokrzyskie Voivodeship, in south-central Poland (historic province of Lesser Poland). It is the seat of the gmina (administrative district) called Gmina Radoszyce. The village has a population of 3,400. Radoszyce was a town from ca. 1370 to 1869.

History 

14th century 
It is not known when Radoszyce received its town rights, most likely it happened during the reign of King Casimir III the Great, probably around 1370. At that time, Radoszyce was located along a merchant road called "via magna", which started at Piotrków Trybunalski, and went towards Lublin and Sandomierz, via Przedbórz, Radoszyce, Chęciny, Kielce, Bodzentyn, Sienno, and Solec nad Wisłą. The parish church of Radoszyce was probably founded in 1364, in a spot where once a hunting chapel of the Piast dynasty princes stood.

In ca. 1369, a royal manor house was built here. In 1411, King Władysław II Jagiełło stayed here for a short time, on his way north to Prussia.

15th century 
Jagiełło visited the town again in 1425, travelling from Greater Poland to Red Ruthenia. Three years later, the king decided to change Radoszyce's town charter from obsolete Polish regulations to the more modern Magdeburg rights. Jagiełło allowed Radoszyce to make two fairs a year. In 1450, another Polish king, Casimir IV Jagiellon, stayed here with his daughters.

16th century 
According to the 1564 documents, Radoszyce belonged to Sandomierz Voivodeship, and was under the jurisdiction of a starosta from Chęciny. Nearby villages of Radoska and Grodzisko were regarded as Radoszyce's suburbs.

17th century 
Radoszyce was destroyed and its population decimated in the Swedish invasion of Poland (1655  1660). After the wars, Jewish people began to settle here, which resulted in frequent clashes with local Christian population.

18th century 
In 1740, town council banned residents from selling their houses to Jews. In the late Middle Ages, the area of Radoszyce emerged as a center of Polish industry, due to proximity of large forests, which provided timber for fuel. In 1781, Jacek Małachowski founded a blast furnace in a village of Antoniow near Radoszyce. It quickly emerged as a main producer of armaments in the Polish–Lithuanian Commonwealth. In 1787, it was visited by King Stanisław August Poniatowski, who wanted to inspect local iron plants. 

On 18 November 1794, the last remaining Lithuanian units of the Kościuszko Uprising, which were under the command of Romualdas Giedraitis, surrendered to the Russians in Radoszyce.

19th century 
After the Partitions of Poland, Radoszyce was first seized by the Habsburg Empire, and in 1815 – 1915, it belonged to the Russian-controlled Congress Poland. In 1821, after the death of Jacek Małachowski, Radoszyce became the property of the government. Following the plant designed by Stanisław Staszic, the area of Końskie and Radoszyce was designed to become a major center of industry, as Old-Polish Industrial Region. In 1823, a large blast furnace was opened at Samsonów. Radoszyce also received a new blast furnace (1824), but it burned in 1839 and was never rebuilt. After the January Uprising, local industry declined, also due to the fact that major railroads missed Radoszyce.

In 1827, the population of Radoszyce was 1,425, with 252 houses. By 1858, the population grew to 1,934, but together with other locations in northern Lesser Poland Radoszyce lost its town charter after the January Uprising (1869).

20th century 
In 1905, the population of the village was 5,379, with a significant Jewish minority. In the Second Polish Republic, Radoszyce belonged to Kielce Voivodeship, and remained a poor village, whose residents supported themselves by trade, agriculture and services.

World War II 
In the late autumn of 1939, after the Invasion of Poland, the unit of Major Henryk Dobrzański operated in the area of Radoszyce. In the late 1941 and early 1942, Jews of Radoszyce were murdered by Germans in the Holocaust. Since the village was a major center of Polish resistance, German occupiers decided to take their revenge on its population. On September 3 – 4, 1944, Radoszyce was surrounded by the Wehrmacht. All residents were ordered to gather in the market square, and Germans began the massacre. They managed to kill 19 residents, when local Home Army units attacked the Wehrmacht, forcing it to retreat. After the battle, however, the village was completely destroyed. On September 29, 1944, near the village of Gruszka, one of the largest battles of Polish resistance took place.

Famous people born in Radoszyce 
  (‎ 17651843), the 1st "Radoshitzer Rebbe" (‎), founder of the Radoshitz (Hasidic dynasty)
 , starosta
 Stanislav (Kasparovich) Eksner (Echsner, Exner),  (1859, Radoszyce  after 1921), a Polish-Russian musician and music educator
 , starosta
 , painter

References

Sources 

 

Villages in Końskie County
Sandomierz Voivodeship
Radom Governorate
Kielce Voivodeship (1919–1939)
Łódź Voivodeship (1919–1939)
Shtetls
Holocaust locations in Poland